Women & Men: Stories of Seduction is a 1990 American drama film consisting of three separate short films. The three segments are directed by Frederic Raphael, Tony Richardson, and Ken Russell and written by Valerie Curtin, Joan Didion, and John Gregory Dunne, based on short stories by Ernest Hemingway, Mary McCarthy, and Dorothy Parker.	
The film stars James Woods, Melanie Griffith, Beau Bridges, Elizabeth McGovern, Molly Ringwald, and Peter Weller. The film premiered on HBO on August 19, 1990.

Plot
The three stories being adapted are "Hills Like White Elephants" by Ernest Hemingway, "The Man In The Brooks Brothers Suit" by Mary McCarthy, and "Dusk Before Fireworks" by Dorothy Parker. All are about romantic liaisons.

Cast
James Woods as Robert 
Melanie Griffith as Hadley
Beau Bridges as Gerry Green
Elizabeth McGovern as Vicki
Molly Ringwald as Kit
Peter Weller as Hobie
Kyra Sedgwick as Arlene
Philip O'Brien as Vicki's Father

References

External links
 

1990 television films
1990 films
1990s English-language films
American drama television films
1990 drama films
HBO Films films
Films directed by Tony Richardson
Films directed by Ken Russell
Films scored by Marvin Hamlisch
1990s American films
Films based on American short stories
Films based on works by Ernest Hemingway